Lari District is one of twenty districts of the province Caylloma in Peru.

Geography 
The Ch'ila mountain range traverses the district. Other mountains are listed below:

Images

See also 
 Qallumayu

References

Districts of the Caylloma Province
Districts of the Arequipa Region